The following lists events that happened during 1919 in Chile.

Incumbents
President of Chile: Juan Luis Sanfuentes

Events

May
14 May – The University of Concepción is established.

Births
18 January – Juan Orrego-Salas (d. 2019)
3 July – Gabriel Valdés (d. 2011)
date unknown – René Rojas Galdames (d. 1988)

Deaths 
20 September – Ramón Barros Luco (b. 1835)

References 

 
Years of the 20th century in Chile
Chile